Sidney Carter Jelinek (March 18, 1899 – March 9, 1979) was an American rower who competed in the 1924 Summer Olympics.  He graduated from the University of Pennsylvania in 1923 with a Bachelors of Architecture degree. In 1924 he won the bronze medal as member of the American boat in the coxed four event.

References

External links
 profile

1899 births
1979 deaths
Rowers at the 1924 Summer Olympics
Olympic bronze medalists for the United States in rowing
American male rowers
Medalists at the 1924 Summer Olympics